The Willows is a historic farm complex located at Cavetown, Washington County, Maryland, United States. The farmhouse is a four bay long two-story Federal brick structure that is painted white.  Also on the property are a one-story stone springhouse; a log pig house; a brick necessary; a stone smokehouse; "the old house," a former slave quarters; and two frame barns.

It was listed on the National Register of Historic Places in 1973.

References

External links
, including undated photo, at Maryland Historical Trust

Farms on the National Register of Historic Places in Maryland
Federal architecture in Maryland
Houses completed in 1795
Houses in Washington County, Maryland
National Register of Historic Places in Washington County, Maryland
Slave cabins and quarters in the United States